Richard Tumusiime Kabonero, commonly known as Richard Kabonero is a Ugandan civil servant and diplomat, who serves as Uganda's High Commissioner to Tanzania, effective 1 August 2017.

Background and education
He was born in Ntungamo District, to Constance Kabonero, a midwife, and the late Kosia Kabonero, a veterinarian, circa 1963. Richard Kabonero's father died before Richard was born.

Career
Kabonero started his career in 1988, working as a Customs Officer at Uganda Customs, the precursor to the Uganda Revenue Authority. Later, he was appointed as an Assistant Secretary, in the Ugandan Ministry of Foreign Affairs.

In 1990, he was appointed as 3rd Secretary at Uganda's High Commission to Kenya, based in Nairobi. Later he was transferred to Uganda's Embassy to the United States based in Washington, DC and promoted to First Secretary, responsible for  Economic, Congressional and Press Affairs.

In 2006, he was appointed Uganda's High Commissioner to Rwanda, based in Kigali, serving in that capacity until 2017. While there, he is credited with the proper supervision of the construction of the Uganda Chancery, saving the government over USh400 million (approximately US$115,000) in annual rent expenses. During his tenure, bilateral trade between Rwanda and Uganda grew from US$50 million annually to US$200 every year. Also, in 2006, only 200 Rwandan students were enrolled in Ugandan schools, compared to over 1,500 in 2016. Richard Kabonero is personally credited with the improvement of relations between Uganda and Rwanda, which were frayed during the Second Congo War.

In January 2017, after 10 years in Kigali, he was transferred to Dar es Salaam, Tanzania, as the substantive High Commissioner. He presented his credentials to John Magufuli, the president of Tanzania on 1 August 2017. He also paid a courtesy visit to Ali Mohamed Shein, the president of Zanzibar on 19 October 2017.

See also
Oliver Wonekha
Ntungamo District
List of diplomatic missions of Uganda

References

External links
Kabonero Demands Sh1 Billion Over Defamation
As the High Commissioner (Ambassador) of Uganda to Tanzania.

Living people
1963 births
Ntungamo District
Ugandan diplomats
People from Ntungamo District
People from Western Region, Uganda
Ambassadors of Uganda to Rwanda
Ambassadors of Uganda to Tanzania